NRP Bartolomeu Dias has been the name of more than one Portuguese Navy ship, and may refer to:

 , an  sloop launched in 1934 and hulked in 1965
 , formerly the  HNLMS Van Nes acquired in 2009

Portuguese Navy ship names